Muriel Barbery (born 28 May 1969) is a French novelist and philosophy teacher. Her 2006 novel The Elegance of the Hedgehog quickly sold more than a million copies in several countries.

Biography
Barbery was born in Rabat, Morocco, but she and her parents moved when she was two months old. She studied at the Lycée Lakanal, entered the École Normale Supérieure de Fontenay-Saint-Cloud in 1990 and obtained her agrégation in philosophy in 1993. She then taught philosophy at the Université de Bourgogne, in a lycée, and at the Saint-Lô IUFM (teacher training college). After she quit her job, she lived in 2008–2009 in Japan (2008 and 2009). She currently lives in Europe.

Her novel L'Élégance du hérisson (translated by Alison Anderson as The Elegance of the Hedgehog) topped the French bestseller lists for 30 consecutive weeks and was reprinted 50 times, selling over a million copies by May 2008. It has also been a bestseller in Italy, Germany, Spain, South Korea, and in many other countries. The story concerns the inhabitants of a small upper-class Paris apartment block, notably its crypto-intellectual concierge, Renée. She and Paloma, the likewise intellectual (even radical) teenage daughter of a resident family, narrate the book in turn. Renée also features briefly in Barbery's first novel, Une Gourmandise, which appeared in Anderson's English translation as Gourmet Rhapsody in 2009.

The Elegance of the Hedgehog was turned into a 2009 film called Le Hérisson (in English The Hedgehog), directed by Mona Achache.

Novels
Une gourmandise, Gallimard, 2000; in English, Gourmet Rhapsody, Europa Editions, August 2009.
L'élégance du hérisson, Gallimard, 2006; in English The Elegance of the Hedgehog, Europa Editions, September 2008.
La vie des elfes, Gallimard, March 2015; in English (translated by Alison Anderson) The Life of Elves, Europa Editions, February 2016.
Un étrange pays, Gallimard, January 2019.

References

External links
 Official website

1969 births
Living people
People from Casablanca
20th-century French novelists
21st-century French novelists
ENS Fontenay-Saint-Cloud-Lyon alumni
Academic staff of the University of Burgundy
Prix des libraires winners
Lycée Lakanal alumni
20th-century French women writers
21st-century French women writers